Anatrachyntis carpophila is a moth in the family Cosmopterigidae. It was described by Jean Ghesquière in 1940 and is known from the Democratic Republic of the Congo.

References

Moths described in 1940
Anatrachyntis
Moths of Africa